M. Qasim Jan (born 10 January 1944) is a geologist and research scientist from Pakistan. He has been the vice-chancellor of three Pakistani universities. His research has been in geology, mineralogy, petrology, geochemistry, and tectonics. He has authored or edited a dozen books, and has published numerous papers on geology and tectonics of the North-West Himalayas. Presently, he is Professor Emeritus at the National Centre of Excellence in Geology, University of Peshawar. Jan is also currently the Secretary General of the Pakistan Academy of Sciences, and of the Association of the Academies of Sciences in Asia. He is also a fellow of the Academy of Sciences for the Developing World (TWAS).

Life and education
Jan was born in Hangu, Pakistan in 1944. He received his elementary and secondary education from various places in northern Pakistan. In 1964, he received a BSc, with First Class Honours in geology, from the University of Peshawar (UoP). He went to the United States to attend the University of Oregon, from where he received a M.S. in 1967. He became a lecturer in UoP in 1968. In 1970, he was promoted to assistant professor at the university. Later, he went to the United Kingdom to pursue his PhD at the University of London King's College. In 1977 he was awarded a PhD in geology, writing his thesis on The mineralogy, geochemistry and petrology of Swat Kohistan, N.W. Pakistan, under the supervision of the mineralogist Robert A. Howie. After his PhD, he returned to Peshawar, where he became Associate Professor in 1979, full Professor in 1983, and Dean of Natural Sciences faculty in 1997.

Academic career 
He performed post-doctoral research at Dartmouth College (1985), University of Leicester (1981, 1989), and University of Oklahoma (1987–88). He was awarded prestigious Fellowships, such as Royal Society, Fulbright, and NERC. He paid visits to many institutions and delivered talks on the geology of the North-West Himalayas in Europe, the US, and Australia. In 1980, he joined the newly founded government-based organisation, the National Centre of Excellence in Geology, where he later served as its Director. He was a visiting professor at the University of Oregon, USA, in 1994–95. From 1997 to 2000, he was Vice-Chancellor, University of Peshawar, and from 1 July 2001 to December 2003, was founder Vice-Chancellor of the Sarhad University of Science and Information Technology, Peshawar. In February 2004, he was selected as Distinguished National Professor of the Higher Education Commission, and from October 2005 to February 2010 was Vice-Chancellor of Quaid-i-Azam University, Islamabad. Jan remained actively engaged in studying various aspects of the geology of the northeast Himalayas and Karakoram, and published a large number of papers both nationally and internationally.

Selected publications

Awards and honours
 Honorary Member, Nepal Geological Society (2007)
 Emeritus Fellow, Mineralogical Society of Great Britain (2009)
 Pakistan civil award Hilal-i-Imtiaz, (2010)
 Pakistan civil award Sitara-i-Imtiaz, (1999)
 Pakistan civil award Tamgha-i-Imtiaz (1994)
 National Book Foundation award for Best Book in Pakistan in Natural Sciences for 1995–1999
 Presidential medal for excellence in teaching, Izaz-i-Fazeelat, 1993
 Gold Medals by Pakistan Academy of Sciences (1980)
 Ministry of Science and Technology Prize for Best Paper, 1996
 Scientist of the Year award, National Book Council of Pakistan (1990)
 Pakistan Academy of Sciences Distinguished Scientist of the Year (2009) award
 Earth Scientist of the Year award, National Book Foundation (1986)

References

External links
  - includes interview with Jan about his research in the Himalayan mountains

Recipients of Sitara-i-Imtiaz
University of Oregon alumni
University of Oregon faculty
University of Peshawar alumni
Academic staff of the University of Peshawar
Academic staff of Quaid-i-Azam University
Living people
1944 births
Alumni of King's College London
People from Hangu District, Pakistan
Fellows of Pakistan Academy of Sciences
Pakistani geochemists
Petrologists
Pakistani mineralogists
Pashtun people